Aris Spiliotopoulos (born 28 October 1966) is a Greek politician of the New Democracy party. He served as Minister for Tourism (2007–09) and Minister for National Education and Religious Affairs from January to October 2009.

He was born in Patras.

He was first elected to the Greek Parliament on the statewide ticket in 2000. In 2004 he was elected for the Athens B constituency, and he was re-elected in 2007.

References

External links
Personal website (in Greek)
Biography on Greek Parliament website

1966 births
Living people
Greek MPs 2000–2004
Greek MPs 2004–2007
Greek MPs 2007–2009
Politicians from Patras
New Democracy (Greece) politicians
Ministers of National Education and Religious Affairs of Greece
Greek MPs 2009–2012
Greek MPs 2012 (May)
Greek MPs 2012–2014